The 2018 Karnataka Legislative Assembly election was held on 12 May 2018 in 222 constituencies to the Karnataka Legislative Assembly. The election was postponed in Jayanagar and Rajarajeshwari Nagar, following the death of the MLA B. N. Vijaya Kumar and a voter fraud scandal respectively till 28 May. The election saw a voter turnout of 72.13 per cent, the highest in Karnataka since 1952 assembly polls. The counting of votes took place on 15 May 2018.

The Indian National Congress (INC) was seeking re-election, having governed the state since elections in 2013. while the Bharatiya Janta Party attempted to regain office, having previously governed the state in 2007 and from 2008 to 2013. The Janata Dal (Secular), and the Bahujan Samaj Party (BSP) contested the election in an electoral alliance. The Aam Aadmi Party also made its debut in the state.

Background 
The tenure of the 15th Karnataka Assembly ended on 28 May 2018.

Organization 
The Times of India reported in late February 2018 that the state had fewer electronic voting machines than the minimum mandated requirement to be stored going into elections for any state assembly. The report stated that only 20 percent or 11,399 EVMs were in place against the requirement of 56,994 machines, one each for a polling station. Bharat Electronics Limited, which provides 80 percent of the machines began supplying during this time. The District Election Officer for the Bangalore region stated that a "vulnerability mapping exercise" would be conducted to ensure "free and fair polls". He added that 550 Sector teams, each headed by a sector magistrate, a police officer (not below the rank of an Assistant sub-inspector) and a videographer, were formed, one for every 15 of the 8,274 polling stations in the said region.

Voter-verified paper audit trail (VVPAT) machines were used with EVMs in all polling stations in Karnataka.

Schedule 

The schedule of the election was announced by the Election Commission of India on 27 March 2018. It announced that polling would be held in a single phase on 12 May and that results would be declared on 15 May. It also declared that the provisions of the Model Code of Conduct "came into force with immediate effect" with the said announcement.

Controversies

Leaked election dates 
The Election Commission of India ran into a major embarrassment on 27 March 2018, when BJP IT cell head Amit Malviya and the Karnataka Congress' social media in-charge, Srivasta, tweeted the dates before they were officially released. However, both of them got the counting day incorrect in their tweets. Both the tweets were deleted after outrage on Twitter. Malviya later claimed that he got the information from Times Now, a 24-hour English news channel. The news was reportedly also shown by a local Kannada news channel. Later it was revealed that even Times Now got the counting day incorrectly as 18 May 2018, instead of 15 May 2018.

Om Prakash Rawat, the Chief Election Commissioner of India, formed a committee to investigate the alleged leak. The terms of reference of the formed committee included probing certain media outlets and Congress' social media head Srivasta, but not BJP's Amit Malviya. This prompted allegations of the Election Commission of India being biased for the BJP by the Congress.

On 14 April 2018, the committee said that the media reports were mere speculation and not a leak.

Voter ID fraud case 
On 11 May 2018, Congress MLA Munirathna and 13 others were booked in an alleged fake voter ID scam. On 8 May 2018, almost 10,000 voter ID cards, along with several laptops, were found in a flat in Bengaluru owned by former BJP leader Manjula Nanjamari. Apart from the voter IDs and laptops, the Munirathna's pamphlets were also found, which turned the needle of suspicion on Munirathna. After the FIR, Munirathna said  "I’ve distributed 40,000 pamphlets asking for votes for me in my constituency and you will find them in every home in my segment. I’ve been named as accused no. 14 because one such pamphlet was found in the flat that was raided. This is an outrageous complaint against me and part of the concerted propaganda to harass and humiliate me."

The polling in RR Nagar was postponed to 28 May 2018 and the counting of votes was done on 31 May 2018.

Kaveri river water scandal 

The Karnataka Legislative Assembly election sparked criticisms from Tamil Nadu over the Karnataka's government for not addressing the issue on properly and for its delay in setting up a Kaveri Management Board. The Supreme Court also issued a strict notice to the Karnataka state government for using the Karnataka Legislative state election as an excuse to resolve the Kaveri river water crisis with Tamil Nadu cannot be acceptable. The election was one of the hottest points considered by the critics for the future of Karnataka in dealing with the rivals, Tamil Nadu over the Kaveri River water dispute.

Election campaign 
The Bharatiya Janata Party (BJP) officially began its election campaign on 2 November 2017. The party spent 85 days covering all the assembly constituencies, culminating in Bangalore on 4 February 2018, with Prime Minister Narendra Modi addressing it. In early March, the party launched a 14-day Protect Bengaluru March travelling across Bangalore aimed at, according to the party, "reviving" and "rebuilding" the city from Indian National Congress' "criminal neglect".

In December 2017, the Karnataka Pradesh Congress Committee, although not part of the election campaign, undertook a task of setting up booth-level committees at 54,261 locations in the state which will be responsible to disseminate information on various programs of the ruling Indian National Congress and their implementation. The move was seen as an "extensive outreach program" preceding the elections.

Opinion polls

Preferred Chief Minister polling 
Some opinion pollsters asked voters the party leader they would prefer as Chief Minister – Siddaramaiah (Indian National Congress), B. S. Yeddyurappa (Bharatiya Janata Party). or H. D. Kumaraswamy (Janata Dal (Secular)). Lokniti-CSDS conducted surveys between 10 and 15 January interviewing 878 people. While 34 percent of the sample wanted Siddaramaiah to remain the chief minister for the next term, 19 percent chose Kumaraswamy and 14 percent chose Yeddyurappa. A poll conducted by CHS in the same month found that Kumaraswamy was the first choice, followed by Yeddyurappa and Siddaramaiah in that order. C-Fore's survey of a sample size of 22,357 voters across 154 assembly constituencies between 1 and 25 March showed that Siddaramaiah, with 45 percent, was the most popular choice for Chief Minister, followed by Yeddyurappa at 26 percent and Kumaraswamy at 13 percent, while 16 percent preferred 'others'.

Exit polls 
The exit polls remained divided, with only one predicting that a party – BJP – would get past the majority mark. Five polls predicted that BJP would have the most seats, while two predicted that the Congress was in a comfortable lead, and one predicted a cliffhanger. Today's Chanakya exit poll, which was released last and took into account voting right until polling closure time, predicted a clear majority for BJP.

Results

Region-wise break-up

District-wise break-up

List of winning candidates 
The election results for each constituency are as follows:

By-election

Government formation

Hung assembly 
The election led to a hung assembly, with the BJP emerging as the single largest party, with 104 seats and the Congress winning the popular vote. BJP under the leadership of Yeddyurappa formed the government, based on being the single largest party of the house, despite the Congress and JD(S) post-result alliance having a majority. The Governor then gave a 15-day window for the new government to prove the majority in the legislature, which was shunned by the opposition as favoring the BJP. The Supreme court then limited the window to 3 days and then Chief minister Yeddyurappa resigned 10 minutes before the trust vote. The INC-JD(S) coalition then formed the cabinet with HD Kumarasamy as Chief minister. This coalition government lasted for 14 months before turmoil started again. 16 Legislators from the ruling coalition resigned within a span of 2 days and 2 independent MLAs switched their support to BJP. This shrunk the house majority to 105 and ruling coalition to 101, and the opposition BJP to 107. After 3 weeks of turmoil, HD Kumarasamy lost the trust vote by 100–107 in the house (held on 23 July 2019) and resigned. Afterward on 26 July 2019, B.S. Yeddiyurapa took oath as the Chief Minister of Karnataka once again.

Bypolls
Bypolls were due to be held in three seats: Jayanagar and Rajarajeshwari Nagar in Bangalore and in Ramanagaram.

Rajarajeshwari Nagar election results were declared on 31 May 2018, and INC candidate Munirathna won by a margin of 28,000 votes taking the Congress' tally to 79 seats and the JD(S)-INC coalition to 118 seats.

Jayanagar Assembly Election result was declared on 13 June 2018. Sowmya Reddy, daughter of former minister Ramalinga Reddy, won the constituency by defeating BJP's BN Prahlad by 2889 votes. 55% polling was recorded in the Jayanagar Assembly constituency on 11 June. The assembly elections were held across the state on 12 May, but the poll in Jayanagar was countermanded following the death of BJP candidate B N Vijayakumar, who was holding the seat. The JDS had earlier pulled out its candidate, formally supporting its coalition partner Congress. This win took the Congress' tally to 79 in the 224 seats assembly and the INC-JD(S) coalition to 118 seats.

The elected Congress MLA for Jamkhandi passed away in a road accident on 28 May 2018.

The results of Jamkhandi and Ramanagaram were declared on 5 November 2018. In Jamkhandi INC (JD(S)-Congress coalition) candidate Ananda nyamagouda(son of Ex MLA: Siddu nyamagouda) won by a margin of 39479 votes taking Congress tally to 80 seats.

In Ramanagaram, (JD(S)-Congress coalition) candidate Anitha Kumaraswamy (wife of Karnataka Chief Minister HD Kumaraswamy ) won by a margin of 109137 votes. And the Congress-JD(S) coalition 120 seats.

Bypolls in 2019
After the Demise of Kundagol MLA C.S. Shivalli and Resignation of Chincholi MLA Umesh Jadhav for Karnataka Assembly, The Bypolls of Karnataka Assembly held on 19 May along with Parliamentary election. Out of 2 seats, Kundagol seat was won by Kusuma Shivalli (Wife of Late C.S. Shivalli) from Indian National Congress and Avinash Jadhav from BJP won Chincholi Legislative Assembly seat (Son of BJP MP Umesh Jadhav)

See also 
 Elections in India
 2018 elections in India
 2019 Karnataka resignation crisis
 2019 Karnataka Legislative Assembly By-election

References

External links
Election Commission of India
Karnataka Assembly Elections 2018 
Karnataka Elections 2018 

15th Karnataka Legislative Assembly
May 2018 events in India
Karnataka
State Assembly elections in Karnataka